Palpusia is a genus of moths of the family Crambidae. The genus was erected by Hans Georg Amsel in 1956.

Species
Palpusia coenulentalis (Lederer, 1863)
Palpusia eurypalpalis (Hampson, 1912)
Palpusia fulvicolor (Hampson, 1917)
Palpusia glaucusalis (Walker, 1859)
Palpusia goniopalpia (Hampson, 1912)
Palpusia plumipes (Dognin, 1905)
Palpusia ptyonota (Hampson, 1912)
Palpusia squamipes Amsel, 1956
Palpusia subcandidalis (Dognin, 1905)
Palpusia terminalis Dognin, 1910

References

External links

Pyraustinae
Taxa named by Hans Georg Amsel
Crambidae genera